Sir Herbert John Clifford Grierson, FBA (16 January 1866 – 19 February 1960) was a Scottish literary scholar, editor, and literary critic.

Life and work

He was born in Lerwick, Shetland, on 16 January 1866. He was the son of Andrew John Grierson and his wife, Alice Geraldine (née Clifford) Grierson.  In 1896 he married Mary Letitia (née Ogston) Grierson, daughter of Sir Alexander Ogston, Professor of Surgery at Aberdeen. They had five daughters including Molly Dickins, author of A Wealth of Relations, about family history, writer Flora Grierson who co-founded the Samson Press, and writer and pianist Janet Teissier du Cros.

He was educated at King's College, University of Aberdeen and Christ Church, Oxford. On graduating from the latter he was appointed Professor of English Literature at his Aberdeen alma mater, where he taught from 1894 to 1915, and subsequently became Knight Professor of English Literature at the University of Edinburgh (1915–1935).

In 1920 he delivered the British Academy's Warton Lecture on English Poetry.

He is credited with promoting interest in the metaphysical poets, especially John Donne, a revival more commonly attributed to T. S. Eliot. His special field of research was English poetry of the 17th century, but he was also interested in Walter Scott.

He lived at 12 Regent Terrace, Edinburgh from 1913 to 1953 and was a member of the Scottish Arts Club.

He died on 19 February 1960 in Cambridge. He is buried in the modern north extension to Dean Cemetery, off Queensferry Road in western Edinburgh with his wife, Mary Letitia (1868-1937).

Works
The First Half of the Seventeenth Century (New York: Charles Scribner's Sons, 1906). Vol. VII in the series Periods of European Literature, ed. Professor Saintsbury
The English Parnassus (1909). An anthology of longer poems, editor with W. MacNeile Dixon
Poems of Tennyson (1910)
The Poems of John Donne 2 vols. (Oxford UP, 1912), editor
 Metaphysical Lyrics & Poems of the Seventeenth Century: Donne to Butler (1921)
Don Quixote: Some War-time Reflections on Its Character and Influence (1921), pamphlet
William Blake's Designs for Gray's Poems (1922)
Poems of Lord Byron (1923)
The Background Of English Literature and Other Collected Essays & Addresses  (1925)
Lyrical Poetry from Blake to Hardy (1928, Hogarth Press)
Cross-Currents in 17th Century English Literature (1929)
The Flute, with Other Translations and a Poem (Samson Press, 1931)
Sir Walter Scott: Broadcast Lectures to the Young (1932)
Sir Walter Scott To-Day: Some Retrospective Essays and Studies (1932), editor
The Letters of Sir Walter Scott  (from 1932), editor
Carlyle and Hitler (1933), Adamson Lecture in the University of Manchester (1930)
Oxford Book of Seventeenth Century Verse (1934), editor with G. Bullough
Milton and Wordsworth (1937)
The English Bible (1943)
A Critical History of English Poetry (1944) with J. C. Smith
The Personal Note, an Anthology of First and Last Words (1946), editor with Sandys Watson
Criticism and Creation With Some other Essays (1949)
Swinburne (1953)

References

Sources
 Benet's Reader's Encyclopedia (Second edition, 1965)

External links

Metaphysical poets at Bartleby.com

1866 births
1960 deaths
Scottish literary critics
Scottish scholars and academics
People from Lerwick
Academics of the University of Edinburgh
Rectors of the University of Edinburgh
Alumni of the University of Aberdeen
Alumni of Christ Church, Oxford
Knights Bachelor